Horkelia fusca is a species of flowering plant in the rose family known by several common names, including  pinewoods horkelia and dusky horkelia. It is native to the western United States from California to Wyoming, where it is generally found in mountain forests and meadows. This perennial herb forms a thick tuft of leaves, each growing erect up to 15 centimeters tall. Each leaf is made up of wedge-shaped or rounded leaflets with toothed or lobed edges. These are often gray-green and somewhat hairy. The brown or reddish hairy stem reaches a maximum height near 60 centimeters and holds an inflorescence of several clusters of flowers. Each flower has small, pointed bractlets beneath larger green, red, or magenta sepals and five white to pinkish petals. The center of the flower has a ring of ten stamens around a bunch of 10 to 20 small pistils.

There are several subspecies, including:
H. f. subsp. capitata (bighead horkelia) — native to the Pacific Northwest
H. f. subsp. filicoides — endemic to Oregon
H. f. subsp. fusca — native to Oregon and Washington
H. f. subsp. parviflora (smallflower horkelia) — throughout the range of the species
H. f. subsp. tenella — occurs only in California

External links
Jepson Manual Treatment
Photo gallery

fusca